John Barr Clark Hoyte (22 December 1835 – 21 February 1913) was an artist and teacher. He was born in London, England but spent most of his career in New Zealand and Australia.

In 1860 he and his wife left Britain for New Zealand where they were to live for 16 years. Three daughters were born in Auckland and it is possible they also had a son.

He moved to Sydney in 1879 and died there in 1913.

Gallery of his works

References

1835 births
1913 deaths
New Zealand artists
Schoolteachers from London
New Zealand schoolteachers
English emigrants to New Zealand
Australian landscape painters